Tongue orchid or tongue-orchid is a common name for several plants and may refer to:
Bulbophyllum fletcherianum
Dendrobium linguiforme
Serapias, genus of tongue-orchids
Serapias lingua, Tongue-orchid
Serapias cordigera, Heart-flowered tongue-orchid
Serapias neglecta, Scarce tongue-orchid
Serapias parviflora, Small-flowered tongue-orchid
Cryptostylis, genus
Cryptostylis leptochila,  Small tongue-orchid 
Cryptostylis subulata, Large tongue-orchid
Cryptostylis hunteriana, Leafless tongue-orchid
Cryptostylis erecta, Tartan tongue-orchid